The FAMAS Award for Best Supporting Actress is one of the FAMAS Awards given to people working in the motion picture industry by the Filipino Academy of Movie Arts and Sciences Award,  which are voted on by Palanca Award-winning writers and movie columnists and writers within the industry.

Winners and nominees
The list may be incomplete such as some of the names of the nominees and the roles portrayed especially during the early years of FAMAS Awards.

Note - The year indicates the awards for the films of that year when those films were originally released. Please refer to the Academy Awards how they label the awards for the films original release date and not the awards ceremony date.

1950s

1960s

1970s

1980s

1990s

2000s

2010s

References

External links
The Unofficial Website of the Filipino Academy of Movie Arts and Sciences
FAMAS Awards

Best Supporting Actress